Zeynep Sönmez (born 30 April 2002) is a Turkish tennis player.

Sönmez has a career-high singles ranking by the Women's Tennis Association (WTA) of 247, achieved on 30 January 2023. She also has a career-high doubles ranking by the WTA of 891, achieved on 12 September 2022. She has won 4 ITF singles title on the tour.

Sönmez competes for Turkey in the Billie Jean King Cup, where she has a W/L record of 1–0.

ITF Circuit finals

Singles: 8 (4 titles, 4 runners-up)

References

External links
 
 
 

2002 births
Living people
Turkish female tennis players
21st-century Turkish women